Elections to Perth and Kinross Council were held on 3 May 2007, the same day as the other Scottish local government elections and the Scottish Parliament general election. The election was the first one using 12 new wards created as a result of the Local Governance (Scotland) Act 2004, each ward will elect three or four councillors using the single transferable vote system form of proportional representation. The new wards replace 41 single-member wards which used the plurality (first past the post) system of election.

The Council continued to be controlled by a Liberal Democrat/Scottish National Party coalition administration.

Election results

Ward results

Carse of Gowrie (3 seats)

Strathmore (4 seats)

Blairgowrie and Glens (3 seats)

Highland (3 seats)

Strathtay (3 seats)

Strathearn (3 seats)

Strathallan (3 seats)

Kinross-shire (4 seats)

Almond and Earn (3 seats)

Perth City South (4 seats)

Perth City North (4 seats)

Perth City Centre (4 seats)

By-elections (2007-12)
 On 22 February 2008 Katie Howie of the SNP was elected to the seat formerly held by her late sister, Eleanor who died in late 2010.

On 6 May 2010, Tom May of the SNP held the seat of his party colleague John Law who had died.

 On 19 September 2011 Mike Williamson of the SNP was elected to the seat formerly held by Ken Lyall who had emigrated to Australia.

References
Overview of Local Government election results 2007 - Perth and Kinross council (accessed 13.05.2011)

2007 Scottish local elections
2007